The montane toadlet (Uperoleia altissima) is a species of frog in the family Myobatrachidae.
It is endemic to Australia.
Its natural habitats are subtropical or tropical dry forests, dry savanna, moist savanna, rivers, and intermittent rivers.
It is threatened by habitat loss.

References

Uperoleia
Amphibians of Queensland
Taxonomy articles created by Polbot
Amphibians described in 1993
Frogs of Australia